Rui Sérgio de Almeida Águas (born February 29, 1972 in Nampula, Mozambique) is a Mozambican-born Portuguese race car driver. Águas spent two seasons in Formula 3000, driving for Nordic in 1997 and Auto Sport and Coloni in 1998. He has since moved on to Formula Nissan and Renault Eurocup, before making a name for himself on the GT class, being one of the top contenders of the GT2 category, always at the wheel of a Ferrari. He is currently racing on the International GT Open.

He has also, prior to his Formula 3000 days, driven for the Marko, Tomakidis, KMS and GM teams in German Formula Three, and also spent some of 1994 in British Formula Renault Championship, finishing second for Martello Racing.

In 1992 he was a works driver for Van Diemen on the British and European FF1800 championship.

For 2012, Aguas competed in the FIA World Endurance Championship in an AF Waltrip Ferrari F458 Italia.

Racing record

Complete International Formula 3000 results
(key) (Races in bold indicate pole position; races in italics indicate fastest lap.)

24 Hours of Le Mans results

Complete FIA World Endurance Championship results

† There was no drivers championship that year, the result indicates team rank in the LMGTE Am Trophy.

Complete IMSA SportsCar Championship results
(key) (Races in bold indicate pole position) (Races in italics indicate fastest lap)

† Águas did not complete sufficient laps in order to score full points.

External links
 

1972 births
Living people
Portuguese racing drivers
British Formula Renault 2.0 drivers
German Formula Three Championship drivers
International Formula 3000 drivers
Formula Ford drivers
EFDA Nations Cup drivers
American Le Mans Series drivers
European Le Mans Series drivers
24 Hours of Le Mans drivers
24 Hours of Daytona drivers
Rolex Sports Car Series drivers
FIA World Endurance Championship drivers
International GT Open drivers
24 Hours of Spa drivers
WeatherTech SportsCar Championship drivers
Blancpain Endurance Series drivers
Asian Le Mans Series drivers
24H Series drivers

Mozambican emigrants to Portugal
Nordic Racing drivers
Scuderia Coloni drivers
AF Corse drivers
Michael Waltrip Racing drivers
RSM Marko drivers
G+M Escom Motorsport drivers
Le Mans Cup drivers